Estadio Municipal de Calama was a multi-use stadium in Calama, Chile.  It was used mostly for football matches and it was the home stadium of Cobreloa until 2012.  The stadium held 13,000 people (seating capacity), it was built in 1952 and was demolished in 2013, to be replaced for the new Estadio Zorros del Desierto.

References

1952 establishments in Chile
2013 disestablishments in Chile
Cobreloa
Defunct football venues in Chile
Sports venues in Antofagasta Region
Sports venues completed in 1952
Sports venues demolished in 2013
Demolished sports venues